Casarecce (from , which means "homemade") are short twists of pasta originating from Sicily which appear rolled up on themselves.

Casarecce pairs well with cream/cheese, meat, napolitana, seafood, pesto and vegetables.

See also
 List of pasta

References

Types of pasta
Cuisine of Sicily